Clivina myops is a species of ground beetle in the subfamily Scaritinae. It was described by Bousquet in 1997.

References

myops
Beetles described in 1997